Walter Schoeller (12 May 1889 – 16 May 1979) was a Swiss athlete best known for his time with Grasshopper Club Zürich.

His performance led Grasshopper to national titles in rowing (1912 and 1913), tennis (1918 and 1922), football (1921) and field hockey (1926 and 1927), and earning him the nickname "Mister GC".

In 1934, Schoeller secured Hardturm Stadium for use by Grasshopper, and it remains their home ground today.

After 42 years of service to the club, Schoeller was named Honorary President in 1976.

External links
Brief biography on Grasshopper website

1889 births
1979 deaths
Grasshopper Club Zürich players
Swiss male rowers
Association footballers not categorized by position
Swiss men's footballers
European Rowing Championships medalists